Sivkovo is a rural locality (a village) in Andreyevskoye Rural Settlement, Alexandrovsky District, Vladimir Oblast, Russia. The population was 6 as of 2010.

Geography 
Sivkovo is located 13 km northeast of Alexandrov (the district's administrative centre) by road. Moshnino is the nearest rural locality.

References 

Rural localities in Alexandrovsky District, Vladimir Oblast